Patsy Harte (born 1940 in Blackpool, Cork) is a former Irish sportsperson. He played hurling with his local club Glen Rovers and was a member of the Cork senior inter-county team from 1962 until 1966.

References

1940 births
Living people
Glen Rovers hurlers
Cork inter-county hurlers